Cottonwood Farm is a collaborative album by Jimmy Webb and the Webb Brothers, released in September 2009 by Proper Records. The album tells the story of the Webb family through the voices of three generations.

Background
Recorded during various sessions in 2008 and 2009, Cottonwood Farm is a family affair, featuring Jimmy Webb and his sons Christiaan, Justin, James, and Cornelius—the Webb Brothers, who have three critically acclaimed albums of their own under their belts—as well as Jimmy Webb's daughter, Camila, and his 86-year-old father, Bob Webb, who sings a "delightfully endearing version" of the classic "Red Sails in the Sunset", making this album a "three-generation family affair".

Regarding the genesis of the project, Jimmy Webb wrote:

Composition
After opening with Webb's classic, "Highwayman", the album moves into what music critic Steve Leggett called its "emotional center" with "Cottonwood Farm", a twelve-minute epic that is "one of Webb's finest" and is "perfectly suited to the familial tone of the project." Jimmy Webb wrote the song in the early 1970s for his grandfather, but never recorded it. The album then moves into three songs by the Webb Brothers, including the lush and elegant "Mercury’s in Retrograde" which shows that "the sons clearly inherited a lot of their father's pop sense." The album transitions back to two Jimmy Webb classics, "If These Walls Could Speak", first recorded by Amy Grant, and "Where the Universes Are", which he wrote for his friend Waylon Jennings. The album also includes Jimmy Webb's "A Snow Covered Christmas", written in the 1980s and recorded here for the first time.

Critical response

In his review for Allmusic, Steve Leggett called the album "a warm fusion of history and melody from a remarkable family with an uncanny affinity for crafting its own elegant brand of pop Americana." The album received four out of five stars on Allmusic.

Track listing
 "Highwayman" (Jimmy Webb) – 4:44
 "Cottonwood Farm" (Jimmy Webb) – 12:03
 "Hollow Victory" (The Webb Brothers) – 2:50
 "Bad Things Happen to Good People" (The Webb Brothers) – 2:55
 "Mercury's in Retrograde" (The Webb Brothers) – 3:21
 "If These Walls Could Speak" (Jimmy Webb) – 5:12
 "Where the Universes Are" (Jimmy Webb) – 5:35
 "Old Tin Can" (The Webb Brothers) – 3:37
 "A Snow Covered Christmas" (Jimmy Webb) – 2:54
 "Red Sails in the Sunset" (Jimmy Kennedy, Hugh Williams) – 1:40

Personnel
Music
 Jimmy Webb – vocals, piano, melodica, organ, background vocals
 Christiaan Webb – vocals, piano, background vocals
 Justin Webb – vocals, guitar, banjo, keyboards, melodica, piano, background vocals
 James Webb – vocals, bass, guitar, piano, background vocals
 Cornelius Webb – bass
 Bob Webb – vocals
 Camila Webb – background vocals
 Sara Beth Webb – background vocals
 Cal Campbell – drums, guitar, percussion
 Julie Carpenter – viola, violin
 Julian Coryell – guitar, ukulele
 Danny Levin – horn
 Michael Levin – cello
 David Moyer – clarinet, flute, saxophone
 Tim Walker – guitar, pedal steel

Production
 Justin Webb – producer, arranger, engineer, graphic design
 James Webb – arranger
 Joe Cassidy – additional production, engineer
 Cal Campbell – engineer, mixing
 Donnie Whitbeck – engineer
 Kerry Cunningham – engineer
 Nina Boneta – engineer
 Elan Trujillo – engineer
 Rick Parker – mixing
 Andrew Bush – mixing
 Gavin Lurssen – mastering
 Andy Luckhurst – design, logo
 Jessica Daschner – photography
 Mac Maker – sculpture

References

2009 albums
Jimmy Webb albums
The Webb Brothers albums